The 1975 South Carolina Gamecocks baseball team represents the University of South Carolina in the 1975 NCAA Division I baseball season. The team was coached by Bobby Richardson in his 6th season at South Carolina.

The Gamecocks lost the College World Series, defeated by the Texas Longhorns in the championship game.

Roster

Schedule and results

! style="" | Regular Season (44–4–1)
|- valign="top"

|- align="center" bgcolor="#ccffcc"
| || at  || Unknown • Charleston, SC|| 7–6 || 1–0
|-

|- align="center" bgcolor="#ccffcc"
| || at  || Unknown • Spartanburg, SC || 16–1 || 2–0
|- align="center" bgcolor="#ccffcc"
| ||  || Unknown • Columbia, SC || 19–2 || 3–0
|- align="center" bgcolor="#ccffcc"
| || West Virginia || Unknown • Columbia, SC || 19–2 || 4–0
|- align="center" bgcolor="#ccffcc"
| ||  || Unknown • Columbia, SC || 10–1 || 5–0
|- align="center" bgcolor="#ccffcc"
| || Richmond || Unknown • Columbia, SC || 6–3 || 6–0
|- align="center" bgcolor="#ccffcc"
| || at  || Unknown • Florence, SC || 1–0 || 7–0
|- align="center" bgcolor="#ccffcc"
| ||  || Unknown • Columbia, SC || 6–0 || 8–0
|- align="center" bgcolor="#ccffcc"
| || Virginia || Unknown • Columbia, SC || 5–4 || 9–0
|- align="center" bgcolor="#ccffcc"
| || vs  || Conrad Park • DeLand, FL || 9–2 || 10–0
|- align="center" bgcolor="#ccffcc"
| || at  || Conrad Park • DeLand, FL || 4–2 || 11–0
|- align="center" bgcolor="#ccffcc"
| || vs Seton Hall || Conrad Park • DeLand, FL || 6–5 || 12–0
|- align="center" bgcolor="#ccffcc"
| || vs Miami (OH) || Conrad Park • DeLand, FL || 3–1 || 13–0
|- align="center" bgcolor="#ffcccc"
| || at Stetson || Conrad Park • DeLand, FL || 6–7 || 13–1
|- align="center" bgcolor="#ffcccc"
| || vs Seton Hall || Conrad Park • DeLand, FL || 3–4 || 13–2
|- align="center" bgcolor="#ccffcc"
| ||  || Unknown • Columbus, SC || 19–2 || 14–2
|- align="center" bgcolor="#ccffcc"
| || Old Dominion || Unknown • Columbus, SC || 10–0 || 15–2
|- align="center" bgcolor="#ccffcc"
| ||  || Unknown • Columbus, SC || 8–0 || 16–2
|- align="center" bgcolor="#ccffcc"
| ||  || Unknown • Columbus, SC || 9–1 || 17–2
|- align="center" bgcolor="#ccffcc"
| || at  || Foley Field • Athens, GA || 2–1 || 18–2
|- align="center" bgcolor="#ccffcc"
| || at Georgia || Foley Field • Athens, GA || 6–0 || 19–2
|- align="center" bgcolor="#ccffcc"
| ||  || Unknown • Columbus, SC || 2–1 || 20–2
|-

|- align="center" bgcolor="#ccffcc"
| || Howard || Unknown • Columbia, SC || 10–0 || 21–2
|- align="center" bgcolor="#ccffcc"
| || at  || Boshamer Stadium • Chapel Hill, NC || 5–2 || 22–2
|- align="center" bgcolor="#ccffcc"
| ||  || Unknown • Columbia, SC || 3–2 || 23–2
|- align="center" bgcolor="#ccffcc"
| || UNC Wilmington || Unknown • Columbia, SC || 12–5 || 24–2
|- align="center" bgcolor="#ccffcc"
| ||  || Unknown • Columbia, SC || 4–2 || 25–2
|- align="center" bgcolor="#ccffcc"
| || at  || Unknown • Due West, SC || 3–0 || 26–2
|- align="center" bgcolor="#ccffcc"
| ||  || Unknown • Columbia, SC || 2–1 || 27–2
|- align="center" bgcolor="#ccffcc"
| || Saint Leo || Unknown • Columbia, SC || 6–3 || 28–2
|- align="center" bgcolor="#ccffcc"
| || North Carolina || Unknown • Columbia, SC || 5–2 || 29–2
|- align="center" bgcolor="#ccffcc"
| ||  || Unknown • Columbia, SC || 6–2 || 30–2
|- align="center" bgcolor="#ffcccc"
| || at  || Unknown • Statesboro, GA || 2–6 || 30–3
|- align="center" bgcolor="#ccffcc"
| || at Georgia Southern || Unknown • Statesboro, GA || 8–2 || 31–3
|- align="center" bgcolor="#ccffcc"
| || at Georgia Southern || Unknown • Statesboro, GA || 7–4 || 32–3
|- align="center" bgcolor="#ccffcc"
| || Wofford || Unknown • Columbia, SC || 5–0 || 33–3
|- align="center" bgcolor="#ccffcc"
| ||  || Unknown • Columbia, SC || 2–0 || 34–3
|- align="center" bgcolor="#ffcccc"
| ||  || Unknown • Columbia, SC || 3–4 || 34–4
|- align="center" bgcolor="#ccffcc"
| || Baptist || Unknown • Columbia, SC || 6–2 || 35–4
|- align="center" bgcolor="#ccffcc"
| ||  || Unknown • Columbia, SC || 6–4 || 36–4
|- align="center" bgcolor="#ccffcc"
| || Georgia Southern || Unknown • Columbia, SC || 9–0 || 37–4
|- align="center" bgcolor="#ccffcc"
| || Georgia Southern || Unknown • Columbia, SC || 2–1 || 38–4
|- align="center" bgcolor="#ccffcc"
| || The Citadel || Unknown • Columbia, SC || 8–5 || 39–4
|-

|- align="center" bgcolor="#ccffcc"
| || at Furman || Furman Baseball Stadium • Greenville, SC || 4–3 || 40–4
|- align="center" bgcolor="#ccffcc"
| ||  || Unknown • Columbia, SC || 4–0 || 41–4
|- align="center" bgcolor="#ccffcc"
| || Jacksonville || Unknown • Columbia, SC || 8–1 || 42–4
|- align="center" bgcolor="#bbbbbb"
| || at  || Haywood Field • Cullowhee, NC || 8–8 || 42–4–1
|- align="center" bgcolor="#ccffcc"
| || at  || Rose Bowl Field • Atlanta, GA || 6–0 || 43–4–1
|- align="center" bgcolor="#ccffcc"
| || at Georgia Tech || Rose Bowl Field • Atlanta, GA || 21–1 || 44–4–1
|- align="center" bgcolor="white"

|-
! style="" | Postseason (7–2)
|-

|- align="center" bgcolor="#ccffcc"
| || The Citadel || Unknown • Columbia, SC || 11–3 || 45–4–1
|- align="center" bgcolor="#ccffcc"
| ||  || Unknown • Columbia, SC || 15–0 || 46–4–1
|- align="center" bgcolor="#ccffcc"
| ||  || Unknown • Columbia, SC || 4–3 || 47–4–1
|-

|- align="center" bgcolor="#ccffcc"
| || vs Seton Hall || Johnny Rosenblatt Stadium • Omaha, NE || 3–1 || 48–4–1
|- align="center" bgcolor="#ccffcc"
| || vs  || Johnny Rosenblatt Stadium • Omaha, NE || 5–1 || 49–4–1
|- align="center" bgcolor="#ccffcc"
| || vs Arizona State || Johnny Rosenblatt Stadium • Omaha, NE || 6–3 || 50–4–1
|- align="center" bgcolor="#ffcccc"
| || vs Texas || Johnny Rosenblatt Stadium • Omaha, NE || 6–17 || 50–5–1
|- align="center" bgcolor="#ccffcc"
| || vs Arizona State || Johnny Rosenblatt Stadium • Omaha, NE || 4–1 || 51–5–1
|- align="center" bgcolor="#ffcccc"
| || vs Texas || Johnny Rosenblatt Stadium • Omaha, NE || 1–5 || 51–6–1
|- align="center" bgcolor="white"

| Schedule Source:

Awards and honors 
Mark Van Bever
All Tournament Team

Steve Cook
All Tournament Team

Earl Bass
All Tournament Team

Gamecocks in the 1975 MLB Draft
The following members of the South Carolina Gamecocks baseball program were drafted in the 1975 Major League Baseball Draft.

References

South Carolina
South Carolina Gamecocks baseball seasons
South Carolina Gamecocks baseball
College World Series seasons